In statistical quality control, the  and s chart is a type of control chart used to monitor variables data when samples are collected at regular intervals from a business or industrial process.  This is connected to traditional statistical quality control (SQC) and statistical process control (SPC). However, Woodall noted that "I believe that the use of control charts and other monitoring methods should be referred to as “statistical process monitoring,” not “statistical process control (SPC).”"

Uses
The chart is advantageous in the following situations:
The sample size is relatively large (say, n > 10— and R charts are typically used for smaller sample sizes)
The sample size is variable
Computers can be used to ease the burden of calculation

The  and s chart plots the mean value for the quality characteristic across all units in the sample, plus the standard deviation of the quality characteristic across all units in the sample as follows:
.

Assumptions
The normal distribution is the basis for the charts and requires the following assumptions:
The quality characteristic to be monitored is adequately modeled by a normally-distributed random variable
The parameters μ and σ for the random variable are the same for each unit and each unit is independent of its predecessors or successors
The inspection procedure is same for each sample and is carried out consistently from sample to sample

Control limits
The control limits for this chart type are:
 for monitoring the process mean
The anti-biasing constants are typically found in the appendices of textbooks on statistical process control. NIST provides guidance on manually calculating these constants

Validity
Thus, the s chart is examined before the  chart; if the s chart indicates the sample variability is in statistical control, then the  chart is examined to determine if the sample mean is also in statistical control. If on the other hand, the sample variability is not in statistical control, then the entire process is judged to be not in statistical control regardless of what the  chart indicates.

Unequal samples
When samples collected from the process are of unequal sizes (arising from a mistake in collecting them, for example), there are two approaches:

Limitations and improvements 
Effect of estimation of parameters plays a major role. Also a change in variance affects the performance of chart while a shift in mean affects the performance of the S chart.

Therefore, several authors recommend using a single chart that can simultaneously monitor and S. McCracken, Chackrabori and Mukherjee  developed one of the most modern and efficient approach for jointly monitoring the Gaussian process parameters, using a set of reference sample in absence of any knowledge of true process parameters.

See also
  and R chart
 Shewhart individuals control chart
Simultaneous monitoring of mean and variance of Gaussian Processes with estimated parameters (when standards are unknown)

References

Quality control tools
Statistical charts and diagrams